A Gamma Cassiopeiae variable (γ Cassiopeiae variable) is a type of variable star, named for its prototype γ Cassiopeiae.

Variability 

γ Cassiopeiae variables show irregular changes in brightness on a timescale of decades.  These typically have amplitudes of the order of a magnitude.  For example, γ Cassiopeiae is usually about magnitude 2.5 and has varied between magnitudes 1.6 and 3.0.  The variations are associated with changes in the spectrum between normal absorption spectra and Be star spectra, often also including shell star characteristics.

Pleione and γ Cassiopeiae itself are both variable stars that have intermittent shell episodes where strong shell features appear in the spectrum and the brightness increases or decreases significantly.  At other times the shell is not detectable in the spectrum, and even the emission lines may disappear.

The General Catalogue of Variable Stars (GCVS) categorises γ Cassiopeiae stars as eruptive variables and describes them as rapidly-rotating B class giants or subgiants, although many of them are main sequence stars.  It distinguishes them from those Be stars that only show smaller amplitude brightness variations.  The GCVS uses the code GCAS to denote γ Cassiopeiae variables.

Mechanism
γ Cassiopeiae variables are understood to be hot stars which have equatorial decretion disks which periodically disappear and reform, or possibly just change dramatically in scale.  They are probably all very rapid rotators and most can be classified as Be stars.  They are often also shell stars at least part of the time, where the disk is seen edge-on and produces very narrow absorption lines in addition to the broader photospheric lines and possible emission lines.  Regardless of whether they are shell stars by the most narrow definition, the periods when they produce strong disks and increase in brightness are known as shell events.

Examples 
 27 Canis Majoris
 Beta Canis Minoris
 Pleione

References

Further reading
 
 

Star types
Gamma Cassiopeiae variable stars